Južni Vetar (Serbian for "South Wind") may refer to:
 Južni Vetar (band), Serbian music band
 Južni Vetar (film), 2018 Serbian film
 , 2021 Serbian film
 Južni Vetar (TV series), 2020 Serbian TV series

See also 
 South Wind (disambiguation)